Rineloricaria wolfei is a species of catfish in the family Loricariidae. It is native to South America, where it occurs in the Ucayali River basin in Peru. The species reaches 14.9 cm (5.9 inches) in length and is believed to be a facultative air-breather.

References 

Loricariini
Fish described in 1940
Catfish of South America
Fish of Peru